The Bryant Bulldogs men's basketball team represents Bryant University in NCAA Division I men's basketball. The team currently competes in the America East Conference. They are led by head coach Jared Grasso and play their home games at the Chace Athletic Center.

History

Bryant University competed in the NAIA as an NAIA independent program from 1963 until 1976 as the Bryant College Indians before the college became a member of the NCAA Division II level in 1977. Bryant's most successful season during the college's tenure in the NAIA came in the 1966–67 season when the team recorded an undefeated regular season, going 22–0 before losing the final two games of the 1966–67 season in the District 32 Tournament. The 22–2 overall record was the team's best during the NAIA years. The 22 wins set a team high win streak that still stands as a school record as of 2012. And the 22 total wins was not eclipsed until the 2003–04 season.

Within a few seasons of transitioning to NCAA Division II, the college became a charter member of the Northeast-10 Conference in 1980.

In 2008, Bryant began the transition to Division I with former Ohio University coach Tim O'Shea. The 2012–13 season marked the first year Bryant was eligible for the postseason, in which they qualified for the 2013 College Basketball Invitational.

O'Shea retired following the 2017–18 season and Jared Grasso was named head coach on April 2, 2018. Grasso orchestrated one of the nation's best turnarounds in his first season in Smithfield, improving the Bulldogs to a 10-win total after inheriting a squad that went 3–28 the prior season. Grasso was named a finalist for the Joe B. Hall Coach of the Year Award, given to the nation's top first-year head coach. The Bulldogs would continue to improve in 2019–20, rising to 15 victories including a win over Fordham in December. Grasso would then lead the Bulldogs to back-to-back Northeast Conference Championship games in 2020-21 and 2021–22, as well as winning the school's first ever NEC regular season championship in 2022. The 2022 NEC Championship game against Wagner resulted in not only Bryant winning their first ever NEC tournament championship, but they also clinched their first appearance in the NCAA Division I Tournament. This was Bryant's last season in the NEC, as the team moved to the America East Conference.

Postseason

NCAA Division I Tournament results
Bryant has made one appearance in the NCAA Division I men's basketball tournament, with an overall record of 0–1.

NCAA Division II Tournament results
The Bulldogs have appeared in seven NCAA Division II Tournaments. Their combined record is 10–9.

NAIA Tournament results
The Bulldogs have appeared in one NAIA Tournament. Their record is 0–1.

CBI results
The Bulldogs have appeared twice in the College Basketball Invitational (CBI). Their record is 0–2.

Coaches

Bryant University has had eight coaches during its history:

Record Book

Year-by-year

 Note: From 2008–2012 Bryant was ineligible for NCAA post season play during transition to NCAA Division I.

References

External links